George Houston or Huston may refer to:

George Houston (actor) (1896–1944), American B-western singer
George Houston (painter) (1869–1947), Scottish oil and watercolour artist
George R. Houston Jr. (1939–2008), American educationalist; president of Mount St. Mary's University
George S. Houston (1811–1879), American Democratic politician; Governor of Alabama 1874–78
George Huston (politician) (1812–1890), Australian politician

See also
George Houston Burr (1881–1958), American architect
George Houston House, 1860 American home listed on National Register of Historic Places in 1980
George Huston, Australian legislator; among Members of the Tasmanian House of Assembly, 1886–1891